The Loussac–Sogn Building is a historic commercial building at 429 D Street in downtown Anchorage, Alaska.  It is a three-story Moderne-style building, with storefronts on the ground floor and offices above, with its long side extending along 5th Avenue, and its main entrance, on D Street.  The based on the building up to the storefront windows is finished in green tile, while most of the building is finished in concrete.  The main entrance has a polished stone surround.  Built in 1947, it is one of the oldest surviving Moderne structures in the city, and was the largest office building in the city at its completion.  It was planned by Zachariah J. Loussac and Dr. Harold Sogn as a small building to house Dr. Sogn's medical practice, but grew in the design to its more substantial form.

The building was listed on the National Register of Historic Places in 1998.

See also
National Register of Historic Places listings in Anchorage, Alaska

References

1947 establishments in Alaska
Commercial buildings completed in 1947
Commercial buildings on the National Register of Historic Places in Alaska
Office buildings completed in 1947
Office buildings in Alaska
Retail buildings in Alaska
Streamline Moderne architecture in the United States
Buildings and structures on the National Register of Historic Places in Anchorage, Alaska